Roger Redgate (born 1958) is a British composer, conductor and improvisor. Born in Bolton, he began his musical training at Chetham's School of Music in Manchester, then attended the Royal College of Music where he studied with Edwin Roxburgh and Lawrence Casserley. Under a DAAD (German Academic Exchange) scholarship he also studied with Brian Ferneyhough and Klaus Huber in Freiburg. In 1984, with the new complexity composers Richard Barrett and Michael Finnissy, he co-founded Ensemble Exposé.

Redgate has worked in the fields of jazz, improvised music, film and television. He composed the scores for a number of Ian Cottage's early short films, including Small Gestures (1995), Mangetout (1996) and Igloo (1998). His piano works have been recorded by Nicolas Hodges. 

In September 1996 Redgate took up the position of Professor in Composition and Director, Contemporary Music Research at Goldsmiths, University of London. His compositions are published by Editions Henry Lemoine, Paris, United Music Publishers, London and the Associated Board of the Royal Schools of Music.

References

Sources

External links
http://www.ump.co.uk/
United Music Profile
Editions Lemoine Profile
https://soundcloud.com/roger-redgate

Living people
People from Bolton
English composers
English conductors (music)
British male conductors (music)
21st-century British conductors (music)
21st-century British male musicians
21st-century British composers
Year of birth missing (living people)